The 1929–30 Pittsburgh Panthers men's basketball team represented the University of Pittsburgh during the 1929–30 NCAA men's basketball season in the United States. The head coach was Doc Carlson, coaching in his eighth season with the Panthers. The team finished the season with a 23–2 record and were named national champions by the Helms Athletic Foundation (two seasons earlier, the Panthers were also named Helms national champions). Chuck Hyatt was named a consensus All-American for the third consecutive season, led the nation in scoring for a second time in his career, and capped off his collegiate career by being named the national player of the year.

Schedule and results

|-
!colspan=9 style="background:#091C44; color:#CEC499;" | Regular season

Source

References

Pittsburgh Panthers men's basketball seasons
Pittsburgh
NCAA Division I men's basketball tournament championship seasons
Pittsburgh Panthers Men's Basketball Team
Pittsburgh Panthers Men's Basketball Team